Robert Wundu Sowa Newcombe (born August 8, 1979) is a former American football quarterback that started for the Nebraska Cornhuskers.

Collegiate career
As a sophomore in 1998, Bobby Newcombe started at quarterback and led his team to a 9-4 record and a No. 19 ranking nationally in spite of suffering from a knee injury in the first game that would plague him all season long. During the season, Newcombe led Nebraska in passing yards with 712 and had 228 rushing yards while completing 50-of-79 passes and throwing just one interception. The 6-0, 195-pound native of Albuquerque, New Mexico also recorded eight rushing touchdowns and one passing touchdown, while his longest run from the line of scrimmage was 20 yards. Newcombe's longest pass play covered 49 yards to wide receiver Matt Davison against Texas A&M on October 10, 1998.

One of Newcombe's most memorable moments for individual game performances came on August 29, 1998 when he completed 9-of-10 passes for 168 yards including a 46-yard touchdown pass to tight end Sheldon Jackson in a 56-27 shootout victory over Louisiana Tech which was televised nationally.

Newcombe was replaced at quarterback by Eric Crouch the following year as Crouch would go on to win the Heisman Trophy in 2001. Newcombe would finish his career as a return man and wide receiver for the Cornhuskers. His four seasons at Nebraska had him totalling 45 receptions for 660 yards with three touchdowns. He also added 48 punt returns for 829 yards which included three touchdown returns. One of those three touchdown returns went for 94 yards against Missouri on September 30, 2000 which set a Huskers school record.

Statistics

Professional career
Newcombe played football professionally in the Canadian Football League for the Montreal Alouettes for one season. He was drafted in the 6th round of the 2001 NFL Draft by the Arizona Cardinals, but wound up playing wide receiver in Canada at the slot receiver's position in 2002.

Personal life
Newcombe now resides in Chandler, Arizona and works as the head coach at Casteel High School. In addition to his education at Nebraska, he has also earned several degrees from the University of Phoenix, including a Doctor of Management.

References

Additional sources
 Lindy's Big-12 Football - 1999 - Volume 13, p. 136, 174-175
 nebraska.statepaper.com - June 30, 2001 article titled "Bobby Newcombe puts Nebraska Behind Him"

1979 births
Living people
American football quarterbacks
American football wide receivers
Sierra Leonean players of American football
Arizona Cardinals players
Montreal Alouettes players
Nebraska Cornhuskers football players
High school football coaches in Arizona
University of Phoenix alumni
Players of American football from Albuquerque, New Mexico
Coaches of American football from New Mexico
Players of American football from New Mexico